Calosoma abbreviatum, short caterpillar hunter, is a species of ground beetle in the subfamily of Carabinae. It was described by Chaudoir in 1869 and is found in Bolivia, Columbia, Ecuador, and Peru.

Description
Pronotum is twice as long and wide and is narrowed. Males have rounded metatrochanter which is also pointed at the tip.

Distribution
In Ecuador, the C. abbreviatum can be found only in Manabí Province while in Peru it is found in only in one type locality which is Tumbes. The anterior tarsus is missing from the male species.

Habitat
Adults fly for January to April and from November to December.

References

abbreviatum
Beetles described in 1869
Beetles of South America